Thomas E. Hodges  (born July 1, 1965) is an American actor and film producer, famous for roles such as Bruno in the 1986 teen film Lucas, and Rich in the NBC (later CBS) series The Hogan Family. He also appeared in such films as 1987's Revenge of the Nerds II: Nerds in Paradise, 1988's Critters 2: The Main Course, 1989's Going Overboard and Steel Magnolias and 1995's Heavyweights.  Hodges was also in the movie Look.

Hodges co-wrote the season six episode of The Hogan Family titled "Best of Friends, Worst of Times", in which his character Rich revealed that he was battling the effects of AIDS.

References

External links 
 

1965 births
Living people
Male actors from Chicago
American male film actors
Film producers from Illinois
American male television actors